Ronaldo Rodrigues de Jesus (born 19 June 1965 in São Paulo, Brazil) is a former Brazilian footballer, initially known on the football pitch as Ronaldo and then as Ronaldão (big Ronaldo) to differentiate him from his younger compatriot and teammate, also dubbed Ronaldo, who was nicknamed Ronaldinho (little Ronaldo) before this was adopted by Ronaldinho Gaúcho.

A former defender, Ronaldão played 14 matches in the Seleção (Brazil national football team) between 1991–1995, scored two goals and won the 1994 FIFA World Cup, although he did not start any matches. He was called up to the World Cup on its opening day, traveling from Japan to the United States as a substitute for injured Ricardo Gomes.

He was also successful at club level, winning numerous trophies.

Career statistics

Club

International

References

External links

Brazilian footballers
Brazilian expatriate footballers
Brazil international footballers
São Paulo FC players
Santos FC players
CR Flamengo footballers
Associação Atlética Ponte Preta players
Coritiba Foot Ball Club players
Shimizu S-Pulse players
Campeonato Brasileiro Série A players
J1 League players
Expatriate footballers in Japan
1994 FIFA World Cup players
FIFA World Cup-winning players
1965 births
Living people
Association football defenders
Footballers from São Paulo